The Men's Super-G competition of the Torino 2006 Olympics was held at Sestriere, Italy, on Saturday, February 18. 

In super-G competitions, skiers must navigate between gates at high speed, and the gates are further apart than in slalom and giant slalom competitions. As in the downhill, there is only one run of the super-G.

The defending World Cup and world champion in super-G was Bode Miller of the United States, Austria's Hermann Maier led the current season and won the Olympic gold medal in 1998; the defending Olympic champion was Kjetil André Aamodt of Norway.

Aamodt won the gold medal again, Maier took the silver, and the bronze medalist was Ambrosi Hoffmann of Switzerland; Miller did not finish.  Through 2018, this is the only successful Olympic title defense in a men's alpine speed event. It was Aamodt's third victory in the Olympic super-G (1992, 2002, 2006) and eighth Olympic medal.

Results
The race was started at 14:45 local time, (UTC+1).

References

External links
Official Olympic Report
Results
FIS results

Super-G